Spondias mombin, also known as yellow mombin or hog plum is a species of tree and flowering plant in the family Anacardiaceae. It is native to the tropical Americas, including the West Indies. The tree was introduced by the Portuguese in South Asia in the beginning of the 17th century. It has been naturalized in parts of Africa, India, Nepal, Bangladesh, Sri Lanka, The Bahamas, Indonesia, and other Caribbean islands. It is rarely cultivated except in parts of the Brazilian Northeast.

The mature fruit has a leathery skin and a thin layer of pulp. The seed has an oil content of 31.5%.

Description 
 

Its bark is thick, corky, and deeply fissured. When slashed, it is pale pink, darkening rapidly. Branches are low and branchlets are glabrous. The leaves are pinnate, with 5-8 leaflets opposite pairs with a terminal leaflet, oblong or oblong lanceolate, broadly acuminate, glabrous. The flowers bloom January to May and are sweet-scented, in large, lax terminal panicles of small white flowers. The fruits have a sharp, somewhat acid taste and are edible. Their flesh surrounds a single spiny kernel.

Use as food

The fruit pulp is either eaten fresh or made into juice, concentrate, jellies, and sherbets.

In Thailand this fruit is called makok and is used in som tam as a secondary ingredient. The young leaves, which taste slightly bitter and sour, are sometimes served raw together with certain types of nam phrik (Thai chili pastes). It is also served with chili powder in Bangladesh where the fruit is known as আমড়া (amṛa).  In India, it is known as Amado in Konkani  and omora in Assamese. In Nepal this fruit is called lapsi. 

As a member of the sumac family (Anacardiaceae), exposure to the sap of this species may result in an identical allergic reaction to that of the poison ivy plant. Those with a known sensitivity to urushiol should exercise caution in consuming or handling this species.

Traditional medicine
In traditional medicine, Spondias mombin has had a variety of uses.  The fruit has been used as a diuretic and febrifuge.  The bark is astringent and used as an emetic and for diarrhea, dysentery, hemorrhoids, gonorrhoea, and leukorrhea.  The flowers and leaves are used to make a tea for stomach ache, biliousness, urethritis, cystitis, and inflammation.

Language
Spondias mombin has several common names. Throughout the Spanish-speaking Caribbean, except Cuba and the North of Mexico where it is called ciruela, in Nicaragua, Honduras, and in Mexico it is called jobo (derived from the Carib language). In Costa Rica it is called yuplón after the English name gully plum. In El Salvador, it is called Jocote de Corona. Among the English-speaking Caribbean islands it is known as yellow mombin or hog plum. In Jamaica it is also called Spanish plum,  gully plum or coolie plum. In Surinam the fruit is called Mope. In Brazil, the fruit is known by several different names, such as cajá, taperebá and ambaló. In Peru, it is known as uvos or mango ciruelo. In Ghana, it is hog plum or Ashanti plum. It is called "Akukor" in the Ewe language of Ghana. In Bengali, it is called আমড়া (Amṛa). In the southern Indian state of Kerala it is called Ambazhanga അമ്പഴങ്ങ. In Kannada it is called AmateKaayi( ಅಮಟೆ ಕಾಯಿ ).  In Goa it is known as 'Ambadde'. In Nigeria, the fruit is called Ughighen in the Urhobo language, Iyeye or Yeye in the Yoruba language, ngulungwu in Igbo and isada in Hausa. Other common names include hug plum, true yellow mombin, golden apple or Java plum, Ambaralla (ඇඹරැල්ල) in Sri Lanka. In Somalia, it is called Isbaandes. In Panama it is called jobo. In "habla congo" of palo mayombe in Cuba, it is called nkunia guenguere kunansieto', ciruela. In Palauan, it is called titimel. In Telugu, it is called karakkaya (కరక్కాయ)

See also
 List of plants of Cerrado vegetation of Brazil
 Amazonian cuisineSpondias purpurea (Purple mombin)Spondias tuberosa (Umbú)Spondias pinnata'' (India)

Notes

References

External links

mombin
Tropical fruit
Trees of Central America
Trees of the Caribbean
Trees of North America
Trees of South America
Trees of Belize
Trees of Costa Rica
Trees of El Salvador
Trees of Guatemala
Trees of Nicaragua
Trees of Panama
Trees of Guyana
Trees of Suriname
Trees of Venezuela
Trees of Brazil
Trees of Bolivia
Trees of Colombia
Trees of Ecuador
Trees of Peru
Trees of Paraguay
Trees of Mexico
Flora of the Amazon
Flora of the Cerrado
Plants described in 1753
Taxa named by Carl Linnaeus
Plants used in traditional African medicine
Medicinal plants of North America
Medicinal plants of South America
Fruit trees